Sitananda College, also known as Nandigram College, established in 1960, is a general degree college in Nandigram, Purba Medinipur. It offers undergraduate courses in arts and sciences. It is affiliated to Vidyasagar University.

History
Sitananda College was established immediately after the independence as a result of the collective effort of common people living in Nandigram and its vicinity. Eminent persons like Dr. P.K. Bhowmik, Dr. B.N. Chandra and Dr. Bhopal Chandra Panda were the major driving force for establishment of the college.

Departments

Science

Chemistry
Computer Science
Physics
Mathematics
Anthropology
Botany
Zoology
Nutrition

Arts

Bengali
English
Sanskrit
History
Geography
Political Science
Philosophy
Education

Accreditation
The college is recognized by the University Grants Commission (UGC).

See also

References

External links
Sitananda College

Colleges affiliated to Vidyasagar University
Educational institutions established in 1960
Universities and colleges in Purba Medinipur district
1960 establishments in West Bengal